Salient Glacier is a glacier on the east side of the Royal Society Range, draining northeast into the head of the Blue Glacier from the slopes of Salient Peak. Surveyed in 1957 by the New Zealand Blue Glacier Party of the Commonwealth Trans-Antarctic Expedition (1956–58). Named after Salient Peak.

Glaciers of Scott Coast